The 2012 NBL Canada Draft was held on August 27, 2012, at the Rogers Centre. A total of 24 players were selected, in three rounds. Robert Curtis was selected with the first overall pick by the Windsor Express, to be traded to the Saint John Mill Rats, for fifth pick Mike Helms and the rights of Isaac Kuon.

Draft

References

National Basketball League of Canada Draft
Draft
NL Canada draft
NBL Canada draft
Basketball in Toronto
Events in Toronto